The 2010 ASB Classic was a women's tennis tournament played on outdoor hard courts. It was the 25th edition of the ASB Classic, and was part of the WTA International tournaments of the 2010 WTA Tour. It took place at the ASB Tennis Centre in Auckland, New Zealand, from 4 January through 9 January 2010. Yanina Wickmayer won the singles title.

Champions

Singles

 Yanina Wickmayer defeated  Flavia Pennetta, 6–3, 6–2.
It was Wickmayer's first title of the year and third overall.

Doubles

 Cara Black /  Liezel Huber defeated  Natalie Grandin /  Laura Granville, 7–6(7–4), 6–2.

WTA entrants

Seeds

 Rankings as of 28 December 2009.

Other entrants
The following players received wildcards into the singles main draw:
  Kimiko Date-Krumm
  Marina Erakovic
  Yanina Wickmayer

The following players received entry from the qualifying draw:
  Elena Baltacha
  Stéphanie Cohen-Aloro
  Edina Gallovits
  Monica Niculescu

See also
 2010 Heineken Open – men's tournament

References

External links
Official website

ASB Classic
WTA Auckland Open
ASB
ASB
2010 in New Zealand tennis